Naci Bastoncu (1 January 1914 - 28 October 1983) was a Turkish footballer who played as a striker.

Playing career
Bastoncu played with Fenerbahçe for his entire career, helping them win 17 domestic trophies. He scored 159 goals in 288 matches. Despite his prolific club career, he was unable to represent the Turkey national team due to the outbreak of World War II.

Honours
Fenerbahçe 
 Turkish National Division (5): 1937, 1940, 1943, 1945, 1946
 Prime Minister's Cup (2): 1945, 1946
 Turkish Football Championship (2): 1935, 1944
 Istanbul Football League (5): 1934–35, 1935–36, 1936–37, 1943–44, 1946–47
 Istanbul Cup (1): 1945
 Istanbul Shield (2): 1938, 1939

References

External links
 Sport.de Profile
 Mackolik Profile

1914 births
1983 deaths
Sportspeople from Trabzon
Turkish footballers
Fenerbahçe S.K. footballers
Association football forwards